Degeneria vitiensis is a flowering tree found on Viti Levu in Fiji. It is relatively common plant and is used as timber. It has been found in upland forests on steep slopes.

References

Magnoliales
Trees of Fiji
Plants described in 1942